Momuna (Momina), also known as Somahai (Somage, Sumohai), is a Papuan language spoken in the highlands of Papua province, Indonesia.

Varieties
Reimer notes two dialects, one on the Balim River and one on the Rekai. One of the differences is that when /u/ follows an /u/ or /o/ in the Balim dialect, it is /i/ in the Rekai dialect. Thus the ethnonym 'Momuna' is pronounced 'Momina' in Rekai dialect.

Classification
The Somahai pronouns, singular *na, *ka, *mo, are typical of Trans–New Guinea languages. They were placed in the Central and South New Guinea branch of that family by Wurm. Ross could not locate enough evidence to classify them. Usher found them to be closest to the Mek languages, in the Central West New Guinea, which partially overlaps with Wurm's C&SNG.

Vocabulary
The following basic vocabulary words of Momuna are from Voorhoeve (1975), as cited in the Trans-New Guinea database:

{| class="wikitable sortable"
! gloss !! Momuna
|-
! head
| toko
|-
! hair
| toko-ate
|-
! eye
| otu
|-
! tooth
| ija
|-
! leg
| i jo-ku
|-
! louse
| amega
|-
! dog
| kwoka
|-
! pig
| uwo
|-
! egg
| magisaga
|-
! blood
| janɨ
|-
! bone
| toko
|-
! skin
| ke
|-
! tree
| kwo
|-
! man
| mogo-mearu
|-
! sun
| ɨkɨ
|-
! water
| iŋga
|-
! fire
| kukwa
|-
! stone
| kɨ
|-
! eat
| nowa-
|}

further reading
Reimer, Martha. 1986. The notion of topic in Momuna narrative discourse. 181–204. Pacific Linguistics A-74. Canberra: Pacific Linguistics.

References

External links 
 Timothy Usher, New Guinea World, Proto–Momuna–Mek
 (ibid.) Momuna
Somahai languages database at TransNewGuinea.org

Momuna–Mek languages